Caer Euni [Grid reference ] is an Iron Age hillfort, about  north-east of the village of Llandderfel and about  north-east of Bala Lake, in Gwynedd, Wales. It is a scheduled monument.

Description
The fort is situated on a narrow ridge, at height .

There is a rampart enclosing the inner area, with a steep slope to the south-east and ditches and counterscarps elsewhere. The principal entrance is in the north-east. The fort was enlarged: there is a bank, formerly the south-west end, traceable across the interior, and further defences were built to the south-west, notably a large rock-cut ditch and a rampart built with the stone from the ditch.

The sites of about 25 round huts, diameter , have been detected, mostly in the later part of the enclosure.

There are some burnt stones in the south-west corner, but this is not thought to be evidence of a connection with the vitrified forts of Scotland.

See also
 Hillforts in Britain
 List of Scheduled prehistoric Monuments in Gwynedd (former Merionethshire)

References

Hillforts in Gwynedd
Scheduled monuments in Wales